Live On is the third studio album by American blues solo artist Kenny Wayne Shepherd, released in 1999. It was certified Gold by the RIAA in 2000. Live On marks the second album (the first being Trouble Is...) to feature vocals from Noah Hunt.

Track listing
all songs written by Kenny Wayne Shepherd except where noted
"In 2 Deep" (Shepherd, Mark Selby, Danny Tate) – 3:15
"Was" (Shepherd, Selby, Tia Sillers) – 4:00
"Them Changes" (Buddy Miles) – 3:19
"Last Goodbye" (Shepherd, Selby, Sillers) – 4:33
"Shotgun Blues" (Shepherd, Noah Hunt) – 4:49
"Never Mind" (Shepherd, Selby, Sillers) – 3:58
"You Should Know Better" (Shepherd, Tate) – 4:12
"Every Time It Rains" (Shepherd, Selby, Sillers) – 3:46
"Oh Well" (Peter Green) – 3:37
"Wild Love" (Shepherd, Tate) – 3:42
"Losing Kind" (Shepherd, Selby, Sillers) – 4:31
"Live On" (Shepherd, Selby, Sillers) – 4:35
"Where Was I?" (Shepherd, Selby, Hunt) – 3:30
"Electric Lullaby" (Shepherd) – 3:12

Personnel

Kenny Wayne Shepherd Band
Kenny Wayne Shepherd: Vocals, rhythm and lead guitar
Keith Christopher: Bass
Sam Bryant: Drums, percussion

Additional Personnel
Pat Hodges, Stephanie Spruill: Vocals
Warren Haynes: Vocals, slide guitar
Bryan Lee: Rhythm and lead guitar
Reese Wynans: Keyboards
Mickey Raphael, James Cotton: Harmonica
Arion Salazar, Les Claypool, Tommy Shannon: Bass
Chris Layton: Drums, percussion

Note that keyboardist Wynans, bassist Shannon and drummer Layton had all served as the backing band for blues/rock guitarist Stevie Ray Vaughan, called Double Trouble.

Charts
Album - Billboard (United States)

Singles - Billboard (United States)

References

Kenny Wayne Shepherd albums
1999 albums
Albums produced by Jerry Harrison